Wife and Auto Trouble is a 1916 American film directed by Dell Henderson and Mack Sennett. It was made by the "Tri-Stone Film Company", an evolution of "Keystone Triangle" which in turn evolved from the famous Keystone Film Company.

Plot 

A new husband shares a house with his wife and mother-in-law and a second man (listed as a brother-in-law). The first scene shows favoritism at the breakfast table to the second man, but whilst he reads his paper the table is rotated to ensure a good cup of coffee for the husband.

At work the husband chats up his secretary Mae Busch and is discovered by the second male who calls his mother-in-law. A car bought for the secretary is given to the wife as a gift to stall her, but the secretary demands it back. Action moves to a private booth in a restaurant/dance hall where a similar evasion act ensues.

A car chase ensues followed by the "Tri-Stone Kops" an evolution from the earlier Keystone Kops.

Cast 
William Collier Sr. as A meek husband
Blanche Payson as His wife
Joseph Belmont as His Brother-In-Law
Alice Davenport as His Mother-In-Law
Mae Busch as A speedy stenographer
 Tri-Stone Kops: Jimmy Bryant, Joseph Callahan, Billy Gilbert, Al Kaufman

See also
List of American films of 1916

External links 

1916 films
American silent short films
1910s English-language films
American black-and-white films
1916 comedy films
1916 short films
Silent American comedy films
American comedy short films
Films directed by Dell Henderson
Films directed by Mack Sennett
1910s American films